Simian refers to the higher primates: monkeys, apes, and humans.

Simian may also refer to:

Places
 Șimian (island), an island on the Danube, in Romania
 Șimian, Bihor, a commune in Bihor County, Romania
 Șimian, Mehedinți, a commune in Mehedinţi County, Romania
Simian Mountain, in Jiangjin, Chongqing

People
 Ng Ser Miang, also known as Huáng Sīmián

Anatomy
 Simian shelf, a bony thickening on the front of the ape mandible
 Single transverse palmar crease, also known as a simian crease orsimian line

Arts, entertainment, and media

Literature
Simians (Chinese poetry), monkeys, gibbons, and other primates in Chinese poetry

Music
Simian (band), an English electronic group
 Simian Mobile Disco, an English electronic music duo and production team
Simian Records, a record company founded by Elijah Wood

Other uses in arts, entertainment, and media
 "The Night of the Simian Terror" (1968), an episode of the television series Wild, Wild West
 The Simian Line (2001), an American improvisational film

Software
Simian (software), open-source Mac OS X software deployment utility
Simian broadcast automation software, by Broadcast Software International

Other uses
 Ethiopian wolf, also called a simian jackal

See also
 Simien (disambiguation)
 Simion, a Romanian name